Joy is an emotion in response to a pleasant observation or a remembrance thereof.

Joy may also refer to:

People and fictional characters
 Joy (given name), a list of people and fictional characters
 Joy (surname), a list of people
 Joy (singer) (born 1996), member of South Korean band Red Velvet
 Joy (model) (born 1985), Japanese model and TV personality
 Joy (Australian musician)

Places

United States
 Joy, Arkansas
 Joy, Illinois
 Joy, Kansas
 Joy, Kentucky
 Joy, Missouri
 Joy, Ohio
 Joy, Oklahoma
 Joy, Texas
 Joy, West Virginia
 Mount Joy, a small mountain in Valley Forge National Historical Park

Elsewhere
 Joy (crater), a lunar crater
 Joy Range, Nunavut, Canada
 Mount Joy, a small hill in Durham, England

Music

Bands
 Joy (Austrian band)
 Joy (South African band)

Albums
 Joy (Steven Curtis Chapman album), 2012
 Joy (Fefe Dobson album), and the title track
 Joy (Isaac Hayes album), 1973
 Joy (Jah Roots album), 2008
 Joy (Paul King album), 1987
 Joy (Shizuka Kudo album)
 Joy (Crystal Lewis album)
 Joy (Phish album), and the title track
 Joy (Psychic TV VHS), 1989
 Joy (EP), by the Minutemen
 Joy (Skids album)
 Joy (The Stalin album), 1989
 Joy (Teddy Pendergrass album), 1988
 Joy: A Christmas Collection, by the group Avalon
 Joy, an album by Yuki Isoya
 Joy, an album by Paper Aeroplanes
 Joy, album by Joe Nina, 1996
 Joy, EP by Woo!ah!, 2022

Songs
 "Joy" (7669 song), 1994
 "Joy" (Bastille song), 2019
 "Joy" (Blackstreet song), 1994
 "Joy" (For King & Country song), 2018
 "Joy" (François Feldman song), 1992
 "Joy" (Mark Ryder song), 2000
 "Joy" (Marvin Gaye song), 1983
 "Joy" (Mick Jagger song)
 "Joy" (Psychic TV song), 1988
 "Joy" (Staxx song), 1993
 "Joy" (Teddy Pendergrass song), 1988
 "Joy" (Toni Pearen song), 1995
 "Joy", an instrumental by Apollo 100 from 1971
 "Joy", a song by Harry Nilsson on the album Son of Schmilsson released in 1972
 "Joy", a song by Against Me! on the album Searching for a Former Clarity
 "Joy", a song by Iron & Wine on the album Ghost on Ghost
 "Joy", a song by Jeremih and Chance the Rapper from Merry Christmas Lil' Mama
 "Joy", a song by Lucinda Williams on the album Car Wheels on a Gravel Road
 "Joy", a song by Mclusky
 "Joy", a 2000 single by Newsboys
 "Joy", a song by Soul II Soul on the album Just Right Vol. III
 "Joy", a song by VNV Nation on the album Praise the Fallen
 "Joy", a song by Whitney Houston from The Preacher's Wife: Original Soundtrack Album
 "Joy", a song by Yuki Isoya 
 “Joy”, a song by Will Young taken from his sixth studio album released as the records second promotional single and was heavily featured in the Morrisons adverts.
 "Joy", a song by Withered Hand from Good News

Literature
 Joy (Bernanos novel), a 1929 novel by Georges Bernanos
 Joy (Hunt novel), a 1990 novel by Marsha Hunt
 Joy (novels), a series of novels by Joy Laurey
 Joy (magazine), an international women's magazine

Television and film
 Joy (2010 film), a 2010 Dutch film
 Joy (2015 film), a 2015 American film starring Jennifer Lawrence
 Joy (2018 film), a 2018 Austrian film
 "Joy" (House), a 2008 television episode

Vehicles

Automobiles
 Chevrolet Onix, an American-Brazilian subcompact car, base model sold as Chevrolet Joy
 Daewoo Matiz, a South Korean city car, sold as Chevrolet Joy in Pakistan
 Daihatsu Cast, a Japanese city car, also sold as Toyota Pixis Joy

Watercraft
 USS Joy (SP-643), a patrol vessel of the United States Navy
 USS Turner Joy (DD-951), a Forrest Sherman-class destroyer of the United States Navy, originally called USS Joy

Other uses
 Joy (dishwashing liquid)
 Joy (perfume)
 Joy (programming language)
 Joy 94.9, a radio station
 Joy Compressor, a make of air and gas compressors 
 Joy FC, a Lesotho football club
 Joy FM (disambiguation), a name used by many radio stations
 Cyclone Joy, struck Australia in late 1990
 Joy, the fictional euphoric drug in the video game We Happy Few

See also
 Joye
 Joys (shipwreck), a steamboat that sank in Lake Michigan
 The Joy (disambiguation)